Cincinnati Township may refer to:

Illinois
 Cincinnati Township, Pike County, Illinois
 Cincinnati Township, Tazewell County, Illinois

Iowa
 Cincinnati Township, Harrison County, Iowa

Ohio
 Cincinnati Township, Hamilton County, Ohio (defunct)

Township name disambiguation pages